No. 331 Squadron RAF was a Second World War squadron of the Royal Air Force. The squadron was primarily manned with Norwegian aircrew. The squadron was part of Fighter Command between 1941 and March 1944 when it joined the 2nd Tactical Air Force until the end of the war. The squadron took part in the Dieppe Raid and the Normandy landings.

History
It was formed as a fighter squadron at RAF Catterick in Yorkshire on 21 July 1941. The squadron was manned by exiled Norwegians, except for the ground crew and the commanding officer.

It was given the RAF aircraft code prefix "FN", which was often said to be an abbreviation for "First Norwegian" or "For Norway", the latter being the squadron's official motto (in Norwegian For Norge). The squadron badge was a Norwegian Viking sword and a British sword in saltire, bound together with a ring — symbolising the friendship between Norway and Great Britain.

The squadron was initially equipped with Hawker Hurricane Mk 1s, inherited from a Polish RAF unit. These had to be rebuilt before 331 Squadron could become operational, on 15 September 1941. It provided defence for northern Scotland, moving to RAF Castletown on 21 August and later to RAF Skaebrae.

On 4 May 1942, the squadron moved south to RAF North Weald, having re-equipped with Spitfires in November 1941.

331 Squadron was joined by a second Norwegian unit 332 Squadron, also flying Spitfires. Together they were known as North Weald Wing and were part of the Allied air umbrella over the landing area in the Dieppe Raid, and later flying fighter sweeps and escort operations over occupied France and the Low Countries.

In November 1943, 331 and 332 Squadrons were transferred to the 2nd Tactical Air Force and became known as No. 132 Airfield; later No. 132 Wing.

Following fighter bomber and tactical air superiority operations, connected to preparations for D-Day and the actual landings in France, the squadron moved to Caen, Normandy, in August 1944. From September onwards, 132 Wing participated in the liberation of the Netherlands and provided air support for the crossing of the Rhine.

On 24 April 1945, the squadron was transferred to North Weald and later to RAF Dyce in Scotland, where 331 and 332 Squadrons converted to Spitfire Mark IXe and Mk XVI.

Following the end of the war, the wing flew to Norway and on 21 September 1945, 331 Squadron was officially disbanded as an RAF unit, with control passed to the re-formed Royal Norwegian Air Force (RNoAF).

Between them during the war, 331 and 332 Squadrons scored 180 confirmed destroyed, 35 probables and more than 100 damaged. Combined losses were 131 aircraft lost with 71 pilots killed.

In honour of the achievements of the Second World War squadrons, the RNoAF has maintained RAF squadron names, including a 331st Fighter Squadron, now flying F-16s and based at Bodø Main Air Station.

Aircraft operated during RAF service
July–August 1941 Hawker Hurricane I & IIB
August–November 1941 Supermarine Spitfire IIA
November 1941-August 1942 Supermarine Spitfire VB
March–October 1942 Supermarine Spitfire IXB
October 1942-November 1945 Supermarine Spitfire IXE

All aircraft operated by No.331 Sqn
1941  Hawker Hurricane 
1941  Supermarine Spitfire   
1951  Squadron deactivated
1952  Republic F-84 Thunderjet  
1957  North American F-86 Sabre
1963  Lockheed F-104 Starfighter
1981  General Dynamics F-16 Fighting Falcon

RAF bases

July–August 1941: RAF Catterick
August–September 1941: RAF Castletown
September 1941-May 1942: RAF Skeabrae
May–June 1942: RAF North Weald
June–July 1942: RAF Manston
July–August 1942: North Weald
August 1942: Manston
August–September 1942: North Weald
September 1942: RAF Ipswich
September–October 1942: North Weald
October 1942: Manston
October 1942-January 1944: North Weald
January 1944: RAF Llanbedr
January–March 1944: North Weald
March 1944: Southend
March 1944: North Weald
March–June 1944: Bognor Regis
June–August 1944: RAF Tangmere
August 1944: RAF Funtington West Sussex
August 1944: RAF Ford
August–September 1944: Villons les Buissons (B.16)
September 1944: Camp Neuseville (B.33)
September 1944: Lille/ Wambrechies (B.57)
September–October 1944: RAF Fairwood Common
October–December 1944: Grimbergen (B.60)
December 1944-February 1945: Woendrecht (B.79)
February–March 1945: Schijndel (B.85)
March–April 1945: Fairwood Common
April 1945: Schijndel (B.85)
April 1945: Enschede (B.106)
April–May 1945: RAF Dyce
May–November 1945: Gardermoen (detachment at Stavanger)

See also
 List of Royal Air Force aircraft squadrons

References

Bibliography

 Halley, James J. The Squadrons of the Royal Air Force & Commonwealth, 1918–1988. Tonbridge, Kent, UK: Air-Britain (Historians) Ltd., 1988. .
 Rawlings, John D.R. Fighter Squadrons of the RAF and their Aircraft. London: Macdonald and Jane's (Publishers) Ltd., 1969 (new edition 1976, reprinted 1978). .

External links

 Historical photos from the No. 331 Squadron during WW2 
 History of No.'s 330–352 Squadrons at RAF Web
 Article about the No. 331-332 Squadrons' 60th anniversary visit to North Weald Airfield

Royal Air Force aircraft squadrons
Royal Norwegian Air Force squadrons
Military units and formations of Norway in World War II